The term "thermal energy" is used loosely in various contexts in physics and engineering. It can refer to several different well-defined physical concepts.  These include the internal energy or enthalpy of a body of matter and radiation; heat, defined as a type of energy transfer (as is thermodynamic work); and the characteristic energy of a degree of freedom, in a system that is described in terms of its microscopic particulate constituents (where  denotes temperature and  denotes the Boltzmann constant).

Relation to heat and internal energy 
In thermodynamics, heat is energy transferred to or from a thermodynamic system by mechanisms other than thermodynamic work or transfer of matter, such as conduction, radiation, and friction. Heat refers to a quantity transferred between systems, not to a property of any one system, or "contained" within it. On the other hand, internal energy and enthalpy are properties of a single system. Heat and work depend on the way in which an energy transfer occurred, whereas internal energy is a property of the state of a system and can thus be understood without knowing how the energy got there.

Macroscopic thermal energy

The internal energy of a body can change in a process in which chemical potential energy is converted into  non-chemical energy. In such a process, the thermodynamic system can change its internal energy by doing work on its surroundings, or by gaining or losing energy as heat. It is not quite lucid to merely say that 'the converted chemical potential energy has simply become internal energy'. It is, however, convenient and more lucid to say that 'the chemical potential energy has been converted into thermal energy'. Such thermal energy may be viewed as a contributor to internal energy or to enthalpy, thinking of the contribution as a process without thinking that the contributed energy has become an identifiable component of the internal or enthalpic energies. The thermal energy is thus thought of as a 'process entity' rather than as an 'enduring physical entity'. This is expressed in ordinary traditional language by talking of 'heat of reaction'.

The term 'thermal energy' is also applied to the energy carried by a heat flow, although this can also simply be called heat or quantity of heat.

Microscopic thermal energy

In a statistical mechanical account of an ideal gas, in which the molecules move independently between instantaneous collisions, the internal energy is the sum total of the gas's independent particles' kinetic energies, and it is this kinetic motion that is the source and the effect of the transfer of heat across a system's boundary. For a gas that does not have particle interactions except for instantaneous collisions, the term "thermal energy" is effectively synonymous with "internal energy". In a material, especially in condensed matter, such as a liquid or a solid, in which the constituent particles, such as molecules or ions, interact strongly with one another, the energies of such interactions contribute strongly to the internal energy of the body, but are not simply apparent in the temperature.

Historical context
In an 1847 lecture titled "On Matter, Living Force, and Heat", James Prescott Joule characterised various terms that are closely related to thermal energy and heat. He identified the terms latent heat and sensible heat as forms of heat each affecting distinct physical phenomena, namely the potential and kinetic energy of particles, respectively. He described latent energy as the energy of interaction in a given configuration of particles, i.e. a form of potential energy, and the sensible heat as an energy affecting temperature measured by the thermometer due to the thermal energy, which he called the living force.

Useless thermal energy
This is the difference between the internal energy and the Helmholtz free energy.

See also
 Geothermal energy
 Geothermal heating
 Geothermal power
 Heat transfer
 Ocean thermal energy conversion
 Orders of magnitude (temperature)
 Thermal battery
 Thermal energy storage

References

Thermodynamic properties
Forms of energy